Streptanthus hispidus, the Mt. Diablo jewelflower, is a rare species of flowering plant in the mustard family.

Distribution
It is endemic to Contra Costa County, California, where it is known from fewer than 15 occurrences on and around Mount Diablo. It grows in rocky outcrops in grassland and chaparral habitat. It is threatened by habitat degradation, such as trampling by hikers and destruction during maintenance activities.

Description
Streptanthus hispidus is a bristly annual herb growing up to 30 centimeters tall. Flowers occur in a raceme, the uppermost ones often sterile and different in form. The bristly bell-shaped calyx of sepals is greenish brown in the fertile flowers and purple in the sterile. Fertile flowers have four light purple petals up to a centimeter long. The fruit is a bristly silique up to 8 centimeters in length.

References

External links
 Calflora Database: Streptanthus hispidus (Mt. Diablo jewelflower)
  Jepson Manual eFlora (TJM2) treatment of  Streptanthus hispidus 
 California Native Plant Society Inventory of Rare and Endangered Plants: Streptanthus hispidus (Mt. Diablo jewel-flower)
U.C. Photos gallery of Streptanthus hispidus images

hispidus
Endemic flora of California
Mount Diablo
Natural history of the California chaparral and woodlands
Natural history of the California Coast Ranges
Natural history of Contra Costa County, California
Endemic flora of the San Francisco Bay Area
Critically endangered flora of California